Richard Thimelby (also known as Richard Ashby; born 1614 – died 7 January 1672) was an English Jesuit missionary priest.

Life
Thimelby was born in Lincolnshire, England. He entered the Society of Jesus in 1632. Having taught philosophy and theology at Liège for about sixteen years, he was sent to work back in his native county. In 1666 he became Master of Novices at Ghent and Rector of the College of St Omer in 1672, where he remained until his death.

Works
His translation of Father Binet's Treatise on Purgatory was edited by Father Anderdon  in 1874. Thimelby also wrote a controversial work, Remarks on Stillingfleet (London, 1672).

External links

References
Attribution
 This entry cites:
George Oliver, Collections (London, 1845); 
Menology of the Society of Jesus (London, 1902);
Sommervogel, Bibliothèque de la Compagnie de Jésus (Brussels, 1890)

1614 births
1672 deaths
17th-century English Jesuits
English academics
English Roman Catholic missionaries
Roman Catholic missionaries in England
Jesuit missionaries